The Mount Pearl Samurai were a Canadian senior ice hockey team from Mount Pearl, Newfoundland and Labrador.  They were part of the Avalon East Senior Hockey League and are eligible for the Herder Memorial Trophy as well as the Allan Cup.

History 
The Mount Pearl Samurai were granted expansion into the Avalon East Senior Hockey League in the fall of 2012.  The addition of the Samurai coincided with the hiatus of the Mount Pearl Blades of the Newfoundland Senior Hockey League, who are sitting out 2012-13 if not indefinitely.

On October 26, 2012, the Samurai played their first ever game, dropping a 10-2 decision to the Northeast Eagles on the road.  On November 2, 2012, the Samurai played their first ever home game, losing 4–3 to the St. John's Caps.  The Samurai's first ever victory came on November 10, 2012, a 6–1 win over the Bell Island Blues at home.

Season-by-Season Standings

2012 Draft Results

2012-13 Roster

See also
List of ice hockey teams in Newfoundland and Labrador

References

External links 
Official Twitter Page
Official League Team Page

Defunct Ice hockey teams in Newfoundland and Labrador
Mount Pearl
Ice hockey clubs established in 2012
2012 establishments in Newfoundland and Labrador